Lahcen is a given name. Notable people with the given name include:

Lahcen Abrami (born 1969), Moroccan footballer
Lahcen Ahidous (born 1945), Moroccan boxer
Lahcen Babaci (born 1957),  Algerian middle-distance runner
Lahcen Daoudi (born 1947), Moroccan politician
Lahcen Haddad (born 1960), Moroccan politician
Lahcen Maghfour (born 1950), Moroccan boxer
Lahcen Ouadani (born 1959), Moroccan footballer
Lahcen Saber (born 1990), Moroccan cyclist
Lahcen Samsam Akka (born 1942), Moroccan athlete
Lahcen Zinoun (born 1944), Moroccan choreographer, dancer and filmmaker

See also
Lahcen, surname